The Subaru Stella is a 5-door kei car produced by Subaru starting in June 2006. The Stella is based on the same architecture as the Subaru R2. It can be considered as a direct replacement of the Subaru Pleo, although the Pleo soldiered on for another four years. It was Subaru's re-entry into the market segment dominated by the Suzuki Wagon R and the Daihatsu Move, hoping to recapture market share after the R2's lower-than-expected sales. The Stella's dimensions are more parking structure-friendly where vehicle stacking is utilized over the Pleo. The most recent generation Stella is a rebadged Daihatsu Move.

The name Stella is Italian for "star", a reference to the Subaru logo.

Electric version 

In June 2008, Subaru unveiled a concept version on an electric vehicle by combining the Stella platform with the electric drive from the Subaru R1e, which uses TEPCO lithium-ion batteries.

It was showcased at the G8 Summit on 7 July 2008. Fuji announced in June 2009 that it planned to sell 170 units through March 2010, primarily to fleet and government users in Japan, with deliveries beginning in late July.

It was also intended to be sold in the European Union starting September 2010, but never was.

Successor 
Due to the 2008 investment of Toyota, the Stella was replaced by a rebadged Daihatsu (a Toyota subsidiary). Subaru immediately started selling one rebadged Toyota, the Subaru Dex, but kept making the Stella and some other kei products for a few years longer than initially planned. The second-generation Stella (model code LA100) was introduced in Japan on 11 May 2011 and is a rebadged Daihatsu Move.

References 

Kei cars
Stella
Vehicles with CVT transmission
Cars introduced in 2006